On 1 May 2012, as a result of a campaign that guaranteed a 50% discount for clients who purchased more than 100 euros in products, there was a rush to the Pingo Doce chain of hypermarkets, on the 369 stores all over Portugal.

This sale resulted in an abnormal flow of vehicles and shoppers to the stores, and the Polícia de Segurança Pública (Police for Public Security) registered more than fifty occurrences, among them civil disorder and assaults, more than half having taken place in the Lisbon region. A row between two shoppers in a store in Senhora da Hora resulted in two people getting injured, hospitalised in Porto. Multiple other assaults between customers in Lisbon, Amadora, Cacem and Loures were reported.

The Jerónimo Martins Group, who owns the Pingo Doce chain of hypermarkets, has denied accusations of dumping after the media attraction the incidents had in the press and public opinion. The Autoridade de Segurança Alimentar e Económica (Authority for Alimentary and Economic Safety) is currently investigating alleged infractions that have taken place during the sale. The matter was also debated in the Portuguese Parliament, where the parliamentary left accused the Jerónimo Martins Group of illegal practices: Catarina Martins, Member of Parliament for the Left Bloc, accused Jerónimo Martins of "crushing" the competition by "taking advantage of the poor economic situation of the Portuguese people". Agostinho Lopes, Member of Parliament for the Portuguese Communist Party, has pointed out that the sale was "yet another act of prepotence by a major sales group", adding that "it's them who run the Government now, apparently."

Many people who witnessed the incidents published videos in the web, via sites like YouTube, that show huge numbers of people crowding the stores, along with empty shelves.

References

Rush to Pingo Doce